The 1827 Guayaquil uprising, also known as the Guayaquil Department rebellion, was a set of actions carried out by the Guayaquil authorities —during its period as a department of Gran Colombia— in rejection of the centralist policies of the Republic of Colombia and others that harmed the interests of various municipalities. This is one of the first rebellions with a separatist tint that took place in the country of Gran Colombia prior to the start of its dissolution process in 1829.

The Free Province of Guayaquil —unrecognized state that emerged after its independence on October 9, 1820— was annexed by military means to Gran Colombia in 1822; then, as a result of the promulgation of the Territorial Division Law of 1824, it became one of the three departments of the Southern District. The Colombian policies that strengthened New Granadan centralism, the imposition of various taxes, and the division of the departments into several provinces and cantons with their own municipality —which undermined the power of the authorities in the departmental capitals— caused unrest in various parts of the country. In addition, the drafting of the Life Constitution for Peru —and the similar project for Bolivia— by Simón Bolívar generated much controversy, causing mutiny of Colombian military divisions. The Cabildo of Guayaquil endorsed the Bolivian constitution and ignored the Constitution of Cúcuta, appointed José de La Mar as its new mayor; in addition, it proclaimed total autonomy with respect to the Republic.

The departure of La Mar to Peru and the sending of Colombian troops from Quito and Bogotá to the borders of the department, made the Cabildo of Guayaquil state that it supported a federalist constitutional reform and temporarily suspended its autonomy unless it is not convened. a new constituent congress. However, this status of complete political autonomy lasted until October 1827, when General Juan José Flores entered the city of Guayaquil with the Colombian army to restore constitutional order.

Background

Free Province of Guayaquil 
The Spanish-American wars of independence that began around 1810 had permeated emancipatory ideas in several members of Guayaquil society, who developed an independence movement that concluded with the taking of power of the city on October 9, 1820 and the immediate reaction of other localities within the province. A provisional civil and military government was formed, as well as an army to ensure and preserve the independent status against the troops loyal to the Spanish Crown. The Free Province of Guayaquil emerged after the proclamation of its Reglamento Provisorio de Gobierno (provisional constitution) on November 11 of that year as an independent state, which was not recognized during the war period. The Protective Division of Quito, the name of the Guayaquil army, began a military campaign with the aim of making the other territories of the former Presidency of Quito independent.

With a good beginning of its campaign with the victory in the battle of Camino Real, the Protective Division advanced rapidly through the inter-Andean alley towards the north; however, the defeat in the first battle of Huachi made the troops withdraw back to the coast. Simón Bolívar wanted to ensure the independence of the newly created Republic of Colombia (now known as Gran Colombia) by sending a division of his army from New Granada to Guayaquil to renew the attack on the royalists entrenched in the Quito mountains. The Colombian army, commanded by Antonio José de Sucre, merged with the Guayaquil troops, with certain Peruvian and River Plate elements, initiating the so-called Campaign of the South that concluded with the independence victory in the battle of Pichincha on May 24, 1822.

Manu militari annexation of Guayaquil to Colombia 
The pretensions of the Guayaquil government board were, after having concluded with the independence of the peoples of the former Presidency of Quito, to form a new state. However, the town hall of the city of Cuenca had decided to annex itself to Colombia on April 11, 1822; and the Quito authorities, after the battle of Pichincha, also made the decision to join the Colombian nation on Sucre's suggestion on May 29. The Free Province of Guayaquil, which had suffered many casualties in its army due to the help given in the Southern Campaign, decided to remain autonomous from any other state.

In the city of Guayaquil there were three factions within the population and its authorities; there were those who preferred an annexation to Colombia, while others saw it more favorably for the territory to be part of Peru, and lastly, those who considered the province to remain independent and autonomous, among whom were José Joaquín de Olmedo and other members of the Government Board. Its status as the main port on the Pacific coast and its rapid commercial growth made Peruvian claims manifest through General José de San Martín. Simón Bolívar, aware of the Peruvian advance, intends to meet in Guayaquil with San Martín to determine his situation. However, Bolívar went ahead and entered Guayaquil on July 11 with an army of three thousand soldiers, forcing the resignation of the Governing Board and proclaiming himself dictator. The interview between Bolívar and San Martín took place on July 26, already dealing with other issues with Peruvian disadvantage in claiming Guayaquil territory. Finally, on July 31, 1822, Bolívar formally decreed the annexation of the occupied Province of Guayaquil to the Republic of Colombia.

Territorial division of 1824 and taxes 
The Republic of Colombia (named by historiography as Gran Colombia to differentiate it from the current republic of the same name) was formally established with the merger of Venezuela and Nueva Granada in the Congress of Angostura in 1819, which drafted the Fundamental Law of the Republic, which was ratified by the Congress of Cúcuta on July 12, 1821 under the official name of the Constitution of the Republic of Colombia. Initially, the Gran Colombian territory included only Venezuela and New Granada, however, later Panama was incorporated in 1821, while Cuenca, Quito and Guayaquil were incorporated in 1822. On June 25, 1824, the Senate and the House of Representatives promulgated the Law of Territorial Division of the Republic in which the Colombian territory was divided into twelve departments grouped into three districts, each department was subdivided into several provinces, and these in turn into several cantons.

With the law of 1824, the department of Guayaquil was divided into two provinces: Guayaquil and Manabí; the province of Guayaquil was divided into the cantons of Guayaquil, Daule, Babahoyo, Baba, Punta de Santa Elena and Machala; and the province of Manabí was divided into the cantons of Portoviejo, Jipijapa, and Montecristi. The cities aspired to regain some control over the rural territory, which they had held for much of the Colony and lost during the Cadiz regime; however, the creation of the 1824 law established a municipality in each canton head. In several parts of the country they were dissatisfied with this provision.

The wars of the Colombian State were supported financially by various taxes and forced contributions. In the municipalities they opposed the figure of the "intendente", who was subject to the central executive power and regulated fiscal resources. The population was opposed to direct contributions falling on owners and professionals. The protests raised in various parts of Colombia caused the rate to be replaced in 1826 by the poll tax, a tax levied on all men between 14 and 60 years of age; Said tax was only in force for two years due to the refusal of the general population to pay it.

La Cosiata 
La Cosiata, also known as the "Morrocoyes revolution", was a political movement that broke out in the city of Valencia, in Venezuela, led by General José Antonio Páez on April 30, 1826. This rebellion consisted of the uprising of several Venezuelan municipalities in favor of autonomy with respect to the Colombian government, proclaiming Páez as civil and military chief of said department. This event laid the foundations for the later separation of Venezuela from Gran Colombia.

The Boliviarian Constitution 
By the beginning of 1825, Peru had not consolidated its independence and there were still redoubts loyal to the Spanish Crown. Simón Bolívar was dictator of Peru, a position that was estimated to be close to being replaced by the election of a purely Peruvian government and that would lead to the restoration of the Peruvian constitution of 1823; however, the Peruvian Congress decided to extend the Bolivarian dictatorship on February 10, and a month later, on March 10, it ceased its functions by its own decision.

1827 Rebellion 
In Guayaquil there was the Departmental Rebellion of April 16, 1827 led by Vicente Rocafuerte and José Joaquín de Olmedo with the support of the Guayaquil people who would express their desire to rebel against the centralist government of Colombia. The protagonists of this feat were the brothers Juan Francisco and Antonio Elizalde, Marshal José Domingo de La Mar y Cortázar, who was appointed Civil and Military Chief.

After the decision by the revolutionaries, the authorities representing the Colombian government, including General Tomás Cipriano Mosquera and Colonel Rafael Urdaneta, who later became president of Gran Colombia, had to leave the city in a hasty escape.

New annexation to Gran Colombia 
Several times the Colombian government tried to retake Guayaquil, even sending military forces as in the case of Generals José Gabriel Pérez and Juan José Flores, but no attempt was successful.

Guayaquil became autonomous again as when it formed the Free Province of Guayaquil, and remained in this state for three months, until mid-July of the same year when Marshal Lamar had to leave the city for having been appointed President of Peru. Simón Bolívar took advantage of this situation to get the separatist forces to give up their attitude, offering total amnesty to the city and the entire province.

Finally, in September the revolution had been completely quelled, things returned to normal and the province returned to the centralist subjection it had maintained before April 16.

References

Bibliography 

 Ayala Mora, Enrique (2008).  Ayala Mora, Enrique, ed. Manual de Historia del Ecuador (Primera edición). Quito: Corporación Editora Nacional. .
 Hoyos Galarza, Melvin; Avilés Pino, Efrén (2009). Historia de Guayaquil. Guayaquil: M.I. Municipalidad de Guayaquil. .
 Morelli, Federica (1 de julio de 2018). «“Una gran asociación de pueblos”. La rebelión en Guayaquil y su percepción de la Gran Colombia (1827)». Anuario Colombiano de Historia Social y de la Cultura 45 (2): 149-174. doi:10.15446/achsc.v45n2.71030.
 Suárez Fernández, Luis; Hernández Sánchez-Barba, Mario (1992). Historia general de España y América. (Segunda edición). Madrid: Ed. Rialp. .
 Pollack, Aaron (18 de julio de 2016). «De la contribución directa proporcional a la capitación en la Hispanoamérica republicana: Los límites impuestos por la constitución fiscal». Araucaria (Sureste, Chiapas: Centro de Investigaciones y Estudios Superiores en Antropología Social) (36): 59-86. doi:10.12795/araucaria.2016.i36.04.
 Vela Witt, María Susana (1999). El Departamento del Sur en la Gran Colombia, 1822-1830 (Primera edición). Quito: Ediciones Abya-Yala. .
19th-century rebellions
Gran Colombia
Guayaquil
1820s in Ecuador